Lino may refer to:
 Lino, short for linoleum, a common flooring material
 Lino, slang for linesman, the former name (still in widespread common use) for an assistant referee in association football
 Lino, slang for a habitual user of the narcotic cocaine

People

Given name
Lino (footballer, born 1971), Brazilian footballer
Lino (footballer, born 1976), Guinea-Bissauan footballer
Lino (footballer, born 1977), Brazilian footballer
Lino (rapper), French rapper; part of the rap duo Ärsenik
Lino Cayetano, Filipino politician
Lino Donoso (1922–1990), Cuban baseball player
Lino Facioli, Brazilian actor
Lino Lacedelli (1925–2009), Italian mountaineer
Lino Rulli, American talk radio host
Lino Saputo, Canadian businessman and founder of the Canadian-based cheese manufacturer Saputo, Inc.
Lino Tagliapietra, glass artist
Lino Urdaneta (born 1979), Venezuelan baseball player
Lino Ventura, an Italian actor who starred in French movies

Surname
Pascal Lino, a French former road racing cyclist
Paulo Rui Lino Borges (born 1971), Portuguese footballer known as Lino

Politics
Libertarian In Name Only
Liberal In Name Only
Labour In Name Only

See also